The Adonis class was a Royal Navy class of twelve 10-gun schooners built under contract in Bermuda during the Napoleonic War. The class was an attempt by the Admiralty to harness the expertise of Bermudian shipbuilders who were renowned for their fast-sailing craft. The Admiralty ordered twelve vessels on 2 April 1804.

Winfield reports, based on Admiralty records, that although all twelve were ordered as cutters, all were completed as (or converted to) schooners. An article in the Bermuda Historical Quarterly reports that eight were built as cutters (Alban, Bacchus, Barbara, Casandra, Claudia, Laura, Olympia, and Sylvia), and three as schooners (Adonis, Alphea, and Vesta). The account does not mention Zenobia, but does mention that Laura and Barbara (at least) were re-rigged as schooners. The discrepancy lies in the poor communications between the Navy Board in Britain and the builders in Bermuda, as well as in deficiencies of record-keeping. Alterations in the masting and rigging of small (unrated) combatants were not infrequent at this time.

Construction
The Navy Board ordered the vessels on 2 April 1804. Goodrich & Co acted as the main contractor to the Navy Board, and contracted out the actual building to different builders in different yards. 
In many cases the actual builder is unrecorded. All twelve vessels were apparently laid down in 1804 (but documentary evidence is lacking). Each vessel was launched and commissioned during 1806 (precise dates unrecorded).

The vessels were all constructed of Bermuda cedar. This durable, native wood, abundant in Bermuda, was strong and light, and did not need seasoning. Shipbuilders used it for framing as well as planking, which reduced vessel weight. It was also highly resistant to rot and marine borers, giving Bermudian vessels a potential lifespan of twenty years and more, even in the worm-infested waters of the Chesapeake and the Caribbean.

Operational lives
Of the twelve vessels in the class, seven were wartime losses. Five survived to be sold between 1814 and 1816.

Ships

Citations

References
 
  

 
+
Ship classes of the Royal Navy
Schooner classes